Thank You is a 2011 Indian Hindi-language romantic comedy film written and directed by Anees Bazmee. The film stars Akshay Kumar, Bobby Deol, Suniel Shetty, Irrfan Khan, Sonam Kapoor, Rimi Sen and Celina Jaitly. Ranjeet, Mukesh Tiwari, Rakhee Tandon, Smita Jaykar and Chahat Khanna are featured in supporting roles with Mallika Sherawat and Vidya Balan in special appearance.

Released on 8 April 2011, and conceptually similar to Bazmee's No Entry (2005), Thank You revolves around three married men and best friends at work who engage in philandering behaviour and run a yacht business, trying to have some fun outside their marriage. However, when suspicion plays its cards right on their wives, enlisted for help arrives private investigator Kishan Khurana, a detective who specializes in extra-marital relationships. However, the course of events that follows Kishan's attempts to expose and reform the men, takes twists and turns that are hard for him to deal with, and what follows suit forms the rest of the story. Most of the scenes in this film were shot in Vancouver, British Columbia and Toronto, Ontario in Canada.

Plot

Raj Malhotra, Vikram Chopra and Yogi Mathur are best friends and business partners who are married to Sanjana, Shivani  and Maya respectively, and live in Vancouver, Canada. The three of them constantly cheat on their wives with not one or two but many women. However, while Yogi is the only unsuccessful one due to Maya having a secret friend spying on him, Raj and Vikram are able to get away with their flirtatious behaviour by fooling their wives and keeping them under check.

One day, when the three wives, who are also friends, meet up, and Maya brings up Sanjana's issue about a free necklace due on Raj when the two met previously that day in a mall, she and Shivani insist on Sanjana having a detective, Kishen Khurana, in reality Maya's "friend", solve the problem. However, when Maya arranges a meeting between them, things don't seem to work out because Sanjana happens to rubbish away Kishen's accusations against Raj. This compels Kishen to try exposing Raj by calling all his girlfriends to the New Year's Eve party, but Kishen's plan goes haywire when Vikram steps in and saves Raj.

Confused to the next day, Raj and Vikram suspect a spy being part of the scandal that was about to occur last night and seek help from friend and Canadian Security Intelligence Service agent KD, who instead suggests hiring a private detective as the matter is too trivial and unprofessional for an intelligence agency to handle. However, as fate would have it, they land up at Kishen's place, and, having recognized him from the party, enlist his help. Kishen, who is apparently crushing on Sanjana, decides to engage Raj and Vikram in a double game, which results in the duo mistakenly assuming Yogi as the informer after Kishen shows them a doctored video of Yogi conversing with Sanjana, and ceasing their friendship with him by exposing him on one of his cheat dates. Later that day, he creates a fracas for Raj by nearly exposing him as a cheater when he is caught in a bathing robe, but Vikram again comes up with an idea, this time about having Raj pose as an undercover cop in the CSIS, who was unintentionally exposed during a "mission" for KD, who played his boss, and was responsible for killing dreaded don King's brother. Sanjana believes the story and forgives Raj, later snubbing Kishen over the exposé.

Realizing that something is wrong with the deal, Kishen learns from Yogi about the plan and decides to expose them by staging himself as King and having them assemble blindfolded, with Sanjana and Shivani in attendance. When the truth is out, Sanjana tries to commit suicide, but Kishen convinces her otherwise, and comes up with a plan to reform Raj and bring his loving former self back to her life, part of which is a plan to entice Raj into jealousy by having Yogi inform him and Vikram of Sanjana beginning an affair and relationship with a dynamic, handsome man, who would be none other than Kishen himself.

Eventually, Kishan's plan of the jealousy game works out well, but trouble brews big time when Shivani, through Kishen's help, has Vikram thrown out of the house upon having obtained ownership of all his property by getting him to unsuspectingly sign "bank account" papers during the time he was advising a troubled Raj, who made a witness. Helpless and destroyed, the three men turn to Kishen for help again, where they request him to blow the covers of their enemies, and vow to batter their fugitives to death, little knowing that they instead have a common enemy in Kishen, who throws a subtle suggestion about the same which they fail to recognize, and while Sanjana is to keep a fast for Raj, Kishan comes up with his own plan and lures the trio to King's house after they end up with his jacket. Kishen then arranges the trio to meet King's wife Maddy, who too is doubting King's possible affair, but the meeting turns out a disaster when they learn that King is innocent and Maddy starts shooting at King left, right and center for flirting with another girl.

While waiting for him at his office to discuss details of the meeting, Raj and Vikram, along with Yogi, finally figure out in a sudden fit of musical epiphany that Kishan was in on the scam, double-crossing the three men while playing for their wives, posing as Sanjana's boyfriend, Shivani's "brother", and Maya's "friend", having lured them to King's lair out of intent. Sanjana disrupts a fight about to break between the four after Kishen arrives to find himself exposed. Assuming her to be openly in league and love with Kishan, Raj demands a divorce from Sanjana, and a shocked Kishan, in the next few days, manages to convince a crying Sanjana for marriage. However, while trying to invite the trio, Kishan is mistaken as the groom-to-be, and they, drunk, are arrested for smashing a police officer's head.

While in the cell, Raj rues about Sanjana and contemplates deceiving her, when he, Vikram and Yogi are bailed out by an injured King. Raj is in fury and decides to kill Kishen, for which King has his henchman Benny give him a gun. Raj succeeds, but when Sanjana confronts him, it turns out that the assembly of people was for the couple's remarriage. However, Kishan reveals himself to be alive, giving the wives relief, with King and Maddy showing up, as Kishan had arranged for their bail. Seeing his dedication, the wives, and Sanjana's mother and sister, ask Kishan about his reason for helping Sanjana way too personally, something which is unexpected of a professional of his kind. Kishen then reveals that his wife Divya once walked in on him cheating on her and killed herself by slitting her wrist. Feeling guilty and breaking down, he set off on a mission to help aggrieved ladies of his wife's kind in order to redeem himself. However, it was with Sanjana that he saw a reflection of his wife in her, and decided to help her.

Finally, the three couples reunite, while Kishen leaves Vancouver for his next mission.

Cast
Akshay Kumar as Kishen Khurana 
Bobby Deol as Raj Malhotra
Irrfan Khan as Vikram Chopra
Suniel Shetty as Yogi Mathur
Sonam Kapoor as Sanjana Arora Malhotra
Rimi Sen as Shivani Chopra
Celina Jaitly as Maya Mathur
Mukesh Tiwari as King
Rakhee Tandon as Maddy, King's wife
Ranjeet as T.T.
Chahat Khanna as Kanisha "Kuku" Arora
Smita Jaykar as Trishna Arora
Shillpi Sharma as Sweety
Mallika Sherawat in a friendly song appearance as Razia
Vidya Balan in a special appearance as Divya Khurana, Kishan's late wife
Lilly Singh in an uncredited cameo in the climax scene

Production 
Kapoor replaced Katrina Kaif as the lead actress, since Bazmee wanted to have a change with Kumar's love interest. The film was shot at different locations in Vancouver, Toronto and Bangkok. It was made on a budget of 500 million, while an additional amount of 80 million was spent on promotions.

Reception

Critical
Though earning more than INR 1 billion and emerging as a commercial success, Thank You opened to negative reviews from critics. Taran Adarsh of Bollywood Hungama rated the film with 2/5 Stars saying, "What could've been an honest take on dishonesty fails to leave a mark eventually". Rajeev Masand of CNN-IBN gave the film one star and stated, "Badly scripted, shoddily photographed and embarrassingly performed, Thank You is one of those rare films that gets absolutely nothing right." Anupama Chopra of NDTV gave one and a half stars and commented, "My brains were battered to pulp and my eardrums are still recovering from Pritam's cacophonous sound-track." Nikhat Kazmi of the Times of India awarded two and a half stars saying, "You have a film that can be an average weekend getaway. Nothing more, not even Mallika Sherawat's item number."

Box office
Thank You had a below average opening of 50 million according to Box Office India. It showed a 20% increase on Saturday, bringing the two-day total to 110 million nett. The film grossed approximately 320 million by the end of the weekend and 520 million nett by the end of its first week.
It raked in 112.5 million in its second week taking the total to 400 million net. The film netted a total of 600 million in India taking its worldwide total 1.08 billion. The film was declared average by BoxofficeIndia.com. The film however managed to recover 90% of its cost through the sale of satellite, music and territorial rights. The satellite and music rights were sold to Colors and T-Series respectively for a sum of 300 million.

Soundtrack

The film's soundtrack was composed by Pritam. The lyrics were penned by Kumaar, Ashish Pandit and Amitabh Bhattacharya. The song "Pyaar Do Pyaar Lo" is originally taken from the film Janbaaz, and is the first remake of the song, the second being "Ek Toh Kum Zindagani" by Tanishk Bagchi for Marjaavaan. An additional song "Viah Di Raat (Khushiyan Da Mela)" was used in the film but has not been included in the soundtrack album.

The film score is composed by Sandeep Shirodkar.

Track listing

References

External links 
 
 

2011 films
2010s Hindi-language films
Hari Om Entertainment films
Films featuring songs by Pritam
UTV Motion Pictures films
Films directed by Anees Bazmee
Indian romantic comedy films
2011 romantic comedy films